Alexander Pavlovich Grachev (born 28 July 1984) is a Russian former competitive ice dancer. With Elena Romanovskaya, he is the 2004 World Junior champion.

Career 
From 1999 to 2006, Grachev competed with Elena Romanovskaya, with whom he won the 2004 World Junior title.

In 2007, Grachev teamed up with Anastasia Platonova. They were initially coached by Elena Kustarova and Svetlana Alexeeva in Moscow. In the summer of 2009, they switched to Alexander Zhulin and Oleg Volkov. They decided to retire from competition in 2010.

Programs

With Platonova

With Romanovskaya

Competitive highlights
GP: Grand Prix; JGP: Junior Grand Prix

With Platonova

With Romanovskaya

References

External links

 
 
 Romanovskaya / Grachev official site

Russian male ice dancers
Figure skaters from Moscow
Living people
1984 births
World Junior Figure Skating Championships medalists
Competitors at the 2005 Winter Universiade